Badshahi Angti is a 2014 Indian Bengali-language thriller film directed by Sandip Ray, based on the novel of the same name by Satyajit Ray, starring Abir Chatterjee and Sourav Das as Feluda and Topse respectively. The film was released on 19 December 2014. It is the first film which stars Abir Chatterjee as Feluda. This was going to be a reboot to previous Feluda film series after Royal Bengal Rahashya. But in 2016 Sandip Ray cancelled the reboot series because Abir Chatterjee started a new version of film series based on Byomkesh Bakshi franchise under Shree Venkatesh Films and Surinder Films. The other reason was the new Feluda movie Sandip Ray intended to make under a Mumbai-based production house Eros International, but Abir has a strict contract with Shree Venkatesh Films and Surinder Films.

It was declared by Sandip Ray instead of continuing the reboot series he will continue the previous Feluda film series after Royal Bengal Rahashya (2011) and Sabyasachi Chakrabarty will return as Feluda and Shaheb Bhattacharya will return as Topshe. There will be two stories in the new film and the film is named Double Feluda. This is going to be a sequel of Royal Bengal Rahashya (2011) and the movie is a 50 years tribute to Feluda. For the cancellation of the reboot series Badshahi Angti is now considered as a stand-alone reboot film.

Plot
Feluda (Abir Chatterjee) and his cousin Topshe (Sourav Das) visit Lucknow with Topshe's father (Deepankar De) to spend the Puja vacation. They arrive at the house of Dhirendra Kumar Sanyal (Biswajit Chakraborty), a friend of Topshe's father. That evening Dr. Shrivastav (Bharat Kaul) also comes to Dhirendra Kumar Sanyal and tells him that last night, a thief tried to steal his 'Ring of Aurangzeb' (The Emperor's Ring) which was given to him by Pyarilaal Seth. After the incident Dr. Shrivastav is afraid and asks Dhirendra Kumar Sanyal to keep the ring safe. Sanyal agrees and keeps the ring at his home. But one day the ring goes missing from there. Then Feluda and Topshe start investigating, to find the culprit.
Meanwhile, Feluda meets an interesting person in the neighbourhood, Mr. Bonobihari Sarkar (Paran Bandyopadhyay). Bonobihari babu has ferocious and poisonous creatures like crocodile, African tiger, hyena, rattlesnake, scorpion and black widow spider in his home. Feluda also meets Mahabir (Tathagata Mukherjee), late Pyarilal's son and a film actor who believes foul play is behind his father's death.
They travel to Lakshman Jhula Temple, Haridwar. Here, when Feluda lights his cigar near the banks of Ganga, Topse gets a glance of a shining object in Feluda's matchbox. He think that it may be the Emperor's Ring (Badshahi Angti). Later that night he asks Feluda about it when Feluda agrees that it was the ring.
Next day when they move on to Lakshman Jhula the whole group gets divided into two and Feluda and Topse accompany Bonobiharibabu. The driver of their car was a servant of Bonobiharibabu, Ganesh Guho (Rajatava Dutta) in Punjabi disguise. They trap Feluda and Topshe in a log house 1.5 miles from Lakshman Jhula. Their whole story is revealed by Feluda and it is also proved that Bonobihari babu is the culprit and also the murderer of Pyarilaal Seth.
The film ends when Topshe regains his consciousness after the last scene climax and glances over Feluda wearing the Badshahi Angti.

Cast
 Abir Chatterjee as Feluda
 Sourav Das as Topshe
 Paran Bandyopadhyay as Banbihari Sarkar
 Rajatava Dutta as Ganesh Guha (Cameo)
 Deepankar De as Binay Mitra/Topshe's father
 Biswajit Chakraborty as Dhirendra Kumar Sanyal
 Tathagata Mukherjee as Mahabir Seth
 Bharat Kaul as Dr. Shriwastav
 Dwijen Bandopadhyay as Bilashbabu/Inspector Gorgori
 Pradip Mukherjee as Ambika (Cameo)

Production

Casting
Abir Chatterjee was cast as new Feluda and Saurav Das was cast as new Topshe in mid-2013. In an interview Sandip Ray said Abir Chatterjee was best fitted to be cast as Feluda.

Filming
Shooting begun from early 2014. 60% shooting was captured in Kolkata, and rest of the shooting was in Lucknow.
In mid-2014, director Sandip Ray said "We will finish shooting by October and release the film in December."

Release
As the earlier Feluda flicks, Badshahi Angti released on 19 December 2014 in West Bengal before the Christmas Eve; and released nationally on 2 January 2015.

Critical reception
The film received mostly positive reviews from critics. Shomini Sen of IBNLive gave it 3 star out of 5, and said: "Sandip Ray offers a genuine film which creates the same magic of Feluda in modern times". The Times of India gave it 3 and a half star out of 5.

Box office
The film collected  in 3 weeks.

Cancelled Sequels and return to the Previous Feluda Series
In December 2014, director Sandip Ray revealed, the sequel to this film will be based on Gangtokey Gondogol, and another sequel will be Nayan Rahasya if he finds an actor who is suitable for Jatayu's role. But in 2016 Sandip Ray cancelled the reboot series because Abir Chatterjee started a new version of film series based on Byomkesh Bakshi franchise under Shree Venkatesh Films and Surinder Films. The other reason was the new Feluda movie Sandip Ray intended to make under a Mumbai-based production house Eros International, but Abir has a strict contract with Shree Venkatesh Films and Surinder Films. For the cancellation of the reboot series Badshahi Angti is now considered as a stand-alone reboot film.

It was declared by Sandip Ray instead of continuing the reboot series he will continue the previous Feluda film series after Royal Bengal Rahashya (2011) and Sabyasachi Chakrabarty will return as Feluda and Shaheb Bhattacharya will return as Topshe. There will be two stories in the new film and the film is named Double Feluda. This is going to be a sequel of Royal Bengal Rahashya (2011) and the movie is heading for the Christmas release in December, 2016. Though Sabyasachi Chakrabarty is 60 years old, in the new Feluda film Feluda will be 50 years old and Topshe will be 30.

References

External links
 
 

Bengali-language Indian films
2010s Bengali-language films
2014 films
Films based on Indian novels
Indian children's films
Indian detective films
Films directed by Sandip Ray
Films with screenplays by Satyajit Ray
Cultural depictions of Aurangzeb